George Richard Morrall (4 October 1905 – 15 November 1955) was an English professional footballer who played as a centre half. Born in Smethwick, Staffordshire, Morrall made 266 senior appearances for Birmingham, which included 243 top-flight League matches and the 1931 FA Cup Final at Wembley. He was a dominant defender, good both in the air and on the ground, and a fierce tackler. He went on to make more than 100 appearances for Third Division South club Swindon Town. Morrall died in Birmingham aged 50.

Honours
Birmingham
 FA Cup runners-up: 1930–31

References

1905 births
Sportspeople from Smethwick
1955 deaths
English footballers
Association football central defenders
Birmingham City F.C. players
Swindon Town F.C. players
English Football League players
FA Cup Final players